Nowe Załubice  is a village in the administrative district of Gmina Radzymin, within Wołomin County, Masovian Voivodeship, in east-central Poland.

The village has a population of 359.

References

Villages in Wołomin County